The State Register of Heritage Places is maintained by the Heritage Council of Western Australia. , 47 places are heritage-listed in the Shire of Perenjori, of which three are on the State Register of Heritage Places.

List
The Western Australian State Register of Heritage Places, lists the following three state registered places within the Shire of Perenjori:

References

Perenjori
Perenjori
Shire of Perenjori